Events in the year 1879 in Japan. It corresponds to Meiji 12 in the Japanese calendar.

Incumbents
Monarch: Emperor Meiji

Governors
Aichi Prefecture: Taihe Yasujo
Akita Prefecture: Ishida Eikichi
Aomori Prefecture: J. Hishida then Hidenori Yamada
Ehime Prefecture: Baron Takatoshi Iwamura
Fukushima Prefecture: Taihe Yasujo
Gifu Prefecture: Toshi Kozaki
Gunma Prefecture: Katori Yoshihiko
Hiroshima Prefecture: Fujii Tsutomu
Ibaraki Prefecture: Baron Tatsutaro Nomura then Hitomi Katsutaro
Iwate Prefecture: Korekiyo Shima
Kumamoto Prefecture: Takaaki Tomioka
Kochi Prefecture: Viscount Kunitake Watanabe then Baron Kokuritsu Kitagaki
Kyoto Prefecture: Baron Masanao Makimura
Mie Prefecture: Sadamedaka Iwamura
Miyagi Prefecture: Baron Matsudaira Masanao
Nagano Prefecture: Narasaki Hiroshi
Niigata Prefecture: Nagayama Sheng Hui
Oita Prefecture: Shinichi Kagawa then Ryokichi Nishimura
Osaka Prefecture: Viscount Norobu Watanabe
Saitama Prefecture: Tasuke Shirane
Shimane Prefecture: Jiro Sakai
Tochigi Prefecture: Miki Nabeshima
Tokyo: Masataka Kusumoto then Matsuda Michiyuki
Yamagata Prefecture: Viscount Mishima Michitsune

Births
January 18 – Tane Ikai, super-centenarian (d. 1995)
August 24 – Rentarō Taki, pianist (d. 1903)
August 31 – Taishō, 123rd Emperor of Japan (d. 1926)
October 1 – Hasegawa Shigure, playwright (d. 1941)
December 3 – Kafū Nagai, author, playwright, essayist, and diarist (d. 1959)

References

 
1870s in Japan
Japan
Years of the 19th century in Japan